Michael Costigan is a film and television producer.

Biography
Costigan graduated from Brown University in 1990. He was a production executive at Columbia Pictures at Sony Pictures Entertainment, where he worked for nine years on films including Bottle Rocket (1996), The People vs. Larry Flynt (1996), Gattaca (1997), Girl, Interrupted (1999), and Charlie's Angels (2000). He left Sony and worked as executive producer on Brokeback Mountain (2005). Costigan started a production company, Corduroy Films, in 2002. He then became president at Scott Free Productions from 2005 to 2012. Costigan left Scott Free to work full-time as a film producer. He started the production company COTA Films and signed a two-year deal with Sony.

Filmography
He was a producer in all films unless otherwise noted.

Film

Thanks

Television

References

External links

American film producers
Living people
Sony people
Brown University alumni
Year of birth missing (living people)